The Tender Trap (1955) is a CinemaScope Eastman Color comedy directed by Charles Walters and starring Frank Sinatra, Debbie Reynolds, David Wayne, and Celeste Holm.

Based on the 1954 play The Tender Trap by Max Shulman and Robert Paul Smith, it marked Sinatra's return to MGM some six years after On the Town. A second film under a new contract with the studio, Guys and Dolls, was actually released ahead of The Tender Trap by one day on November 3, 1955.
 
The film earned an Oscar nomination in the category of Best Original Song for "(Love Is) the Tender Trap" (music by Jimmy Van Heusen and lyrics by Sammy Cahn). The song proved a hit for Sinatra, one he would continue to sing throughout his career. It is performed in a pre-credits sequence by Sinatra, sung in the film by Reynolds in a lackluster version that Sinatra corrects, and yet again at the end of the film by Sinatra, Reynolds, Holm and Wayne.

Plot
Charlie Y. Reader is a 35-year-old theatrical agent in New York City, living a seemingly idyllic life as a bachelor. Numerous women – among them Poppy, Helen, and Jessica – come and go, cleaning and cooking for him.

Charlie's best friend since kindergarten, Joe McCall, who has a wife named Ethel and children in Indianapolis, comes to New York for a stay at Charlie's apartment, claiming that the excitement is gone from his 11-year marriage and that he wants to leave his wife. Joe envies and is amazed by Charlie's parade of girlfriends, while Charlie professes admiration for Joe's married life and family.

At an audition, Charlie meets singer-actress Julie Gillis. She has her life planned to a tight schedule, determined to marry and retire from performing to a life of child-rearing by 22. Although at first she wards off Charlie's advances, she comes to see him as the ideal man for her plans. Julie demands that Charlie stop seeing other women. Charlie balks, but he begins to fall in love with her.

Joe starts keeping company with Sylvia Crewes, a sophisticated classical musician and a typically neglected lover of Charlie's. Sylvia is approaching 33 and desires marriage as much as the younger Julie does.

One day, annoyed by Julie and possibly jealous of Joe's attentions, Charlie blurts out a proposal of marriage to Sylvia. She is thrilled, only to discover the morning after their engagement party that he has proposed to Julie as well.

Joe confesses his love to Sylvia and asks her to marry him. She turns him down, knowing that he loves his wife and children. Sylvia reminds Joe that girls turn into wives when they marry and she wants the same things Ethel does. On her way out, Sylvia runs into a charming stranger near the elevator who clearly wants to get to know her much better.

Joe packs up and returns to Indiana to his wife. Charlie, his other girlfriends also having moved on with their lives, leaves for Europe for a year.

Charlie returns just in time to see Sylvia marrying the new man in her life. She flips him the bridal bouquet. Julie is also at the wedding. Charlie tosses the flowers to her, then asks her to marry him. She agrees and they kiss.

Cast
Frank Sinatra as Charlie Y. Reader
Debbie Reynolds as Julie Gillis
Celeste Holm as Sylvia Crewes
David Wayne as Joe McCall
Lola Albright as Poppy Masters
Carolyn Jones as Helen
Jarma Lewis as Jessica Collins
Howard St. John as Mr. Sayers
Tom Helmore as Mr. Loughran
Joey Faye as Sol Z. Steiner
Willard Sage as Director
Marc Wilder as Actor-Ballet
Jack Boyle as Audition Dancer
James Drury as Eddie
Gordon Richards as the Doorman (uncredited)

Reception
According to MGM records the film earned $3,054,000 in the US and Canada and $1,441,000 elsewhere resulting in a profit of $1,410,000.

See also
 List of American films of 1955

References

External links

Metro-Goldwyn-Mayer films
Films directed by Charles Walters
American musical comedy films
Films set in New York City
1955 romantic comedy films
American films based on plays
Films with screenplays by Julius J. Epstein
CinemaScope films
1950s English-language films
1950s American films